Beakley Glacier is a glacier on the west side of the Duncan Peninsula on Carney Island, flowing north into the Amundsen Sea, with Ramage Point just west of the glacier. It was delineated by the United States Geological Survey from aerial photos taken by U.S. Navy Operation Highjump in January 1947, and named by the Advisory Committee on Antarctic Names for Vice Admiral W.M. Beakley, U.S. Navy, Deputy Chief of Naval Operations for Ship Operations and Readiness during the IGY period, 1957–58.

See also
 List of glaciers in the Antarctic
 Glaciology

References

 

Glaciers of Marie Byrd Land